Churches Beyond Borders is an ecumenical grouping of Anglicans and Lutherans in North America. It includes The Episcopal Church (domestic dioceses and provinces), the Anglican Church of Canada, the Evangelical Lutheran Church in America (outside of the Bahamas), and the Evangelical Lutheran Church in Canada. Through the heads of communion in each member church, the group issues regular statements on the Doctrine of Discovery, climate change, racial reconciliation, gender justice, and other matters. It builds on the Canadian 2001 Waterloo Declaration and the 1999-2000 American document Called to Common Mission as an expression of full communion among Anglicans and Lutherans in North America.

See also

 Anglican Communion and ecumenism
 Porvoo Communion

External links 
Memorandum of Mutual Recognition of Relations of Full Communion between the Churches of Called to Common Mission (The Episcopal Church and the Evangelical Lutheran Church in America) and the Churches of Called to Full Communion: The Waterloo Declaration (The Anglican Church of Canada and the Evangelical Lutheran Church in Canada) (2018)
ELCA, Episcopalian, Anglican, ELCIC leaders commend call to discipleship (June 7, 2019)
Churches Beyond Borders—Advent Call to Address Racism and White Supremacy (November 30, 2020)
Churches Beyond Borders issue statement for the International Day for the Elimination of Racial Discrimination (March 17, 2021)
Churches Beyond Borders calls for education, solidarity around Doctrine of Discovery (September 23, 2021)
Churches Beyond Borders: Joint Devotions 2021 (November 3, 2021)

Protestant ecumenism
Episcopal Church (United States)
Evangelical Lutheran Church in America
Anglican ecumenism